Depressaria artemisiae is a moth of the family Depressariidae. It is found in most of Europe, except Ireland, Great Britain, the Netherlands, Belgium, the Iberian Peninsula and most of the Balkan Peninsula. It is also found in North America.

The wingspan is 15–19 mm. Adults are on wing in August and September.

The larvae feed on Artemisia campestris.

References

External links
lepiforum.de

Moths described in 1864
Depressaria
Moths of Europe
Moths of North America
Taxa named by František Antonín Nickerl